Beatriz Zamora López (1871 – 6 February 1933) was the first wife of Ricardo Jiménez Oreamuno and First Lady of Costa Rica during the third and last presidency of her husband. She was a controversial figure at the time because she had practised prostitution prior to her romance and marriage to Jiménez.

Biography
López was born in Villa de Pacaca, now named Ciudad Colón, Costa Rica, in 1871, the daughter of Jesús Zamora Zúñiga and María Josefa López Torres. While still young, and with her sister Vicenta, she moved to the capital, San José to serve as a domestic servant in a high society house. She desired to have the luxurious life that was denied to her by her humble origins, so, along with her sister, she entered prostitution. Through this work she met the jurist and liberal politician Ricardo Jiménez Oreamuno; the only person in the history of Costa Rica who has been elected president of Costa Rica on three separate occasions. Jimenez and López had a relationship for many years before they were finally married after his second term as president. The Apostolic Nuncio, Monsignor Giuseppe Fieta, officiated at the ceremony on 21 December 1928.

First Lady
When Jiménez entered his third term as president López became First Lady, but had to endure ridicule and sarcasm from Costa Rica's high society as a result of her previous profession, sometimes being unkindly referred to as La Cucaracha (cockroach).  She spoke English and French and learned various cultural, political and historical issues thanks to her highly educated husband. She carried out humanitarian work as First Lady with little support. With help from some friends and the Mercedarian Sisters, López worked to helping those in need, including the inmates of San Lucas Island. She also helped artists and writers who were in need.

Death
A few months after becoming First Lady, López began to have a variety of physical discomforts and traveled to the US to consult with doctors there. They diagnosed advanced stomach cancer. López died in San José, after less than a year in office, on 6 February 1933, her husband's 74th birthday, She was buried at dawn the following morning with only her husband and a small number of relatives present.

In media
Artist Fausto Pacheco was imprisoned in 1924 on the orders of Jiménez for drawing and publishing a political cartoon mocking the President's relationship with López.

In 2016 a play was presented at the Eugene O'Neill Theatre in San Pedro, Costa Rica entitled La Mariposa y el Presidente (The Butterfly and the President). The play sought to portray the life of López without the prejudices that the Costa Rican society had shown against her during her lifetime.

References

1871 births
1933 deaths
First ladies and gentlemen of Costa Rica
19th-century Costa Rican people
20th-century Costa Rican people
People from San José Province
Costa Rican prostitutes